Good Shepherd Convent or Convent of the Good Shepherd may refer to:
 any convent of the Congregation of Our Lady of Charity of the Good Shepherd
 Good Shepherd Convent, Colombo, school
 Good Shepherd Convent, Chennai, school
 Good Shepherd Convent, Shahdol, school
 Convent of the Good Shepherd, Finchley, former reformatory